Grease Monkey is a comic book created by Tim Eldred. There were two issues published in color by Kitchen Sink Press in 1996, then Image Comics reprinted the first four stories in black and white in 1998. Currently Tor Books has released in book form: the first six stories, with previously unpublished material, and three vignettes. A second book, A Tale of Two Species, was published on the internet in 19 chapters, approximately monthly, starting in October 2007. Both volumes depict life aboard the military space station Fist of Earth, or adjacent smaller spaceships.

Main characters
 Robin Plotnik - An assistant mechanic serving the 'Barbarians', an all-female fighter squadron stationed on the Fist of Earth.
 McGimben Gimbensky - Called Mac; an iconoclast anthropomorphic gorilla. Chief mechanic to 'Barbarian Squadron', and therefore Robin's mentor. Often a source both of comic relief and social wisdom. Robin's closest friend; but disliked by most of the station's human staff.

Other characters
 Kevin Nedelmat - Assistant mechanic for Hardrider Squadron, until dismissed and sent to Earth for taking part in a betting scandal. Robin's classmate.
 Barbara Brand - Captain, and namesake, of Barbarian Squadron. A vociferous speaker, able pilot, and clear thinker. In later episodes, something of an elder-sister figure to Robin.
 Admiral Evelyn Stettler - Supporting character. Commander of the Fist of Earth (described as the first gorilla to achieve equal rank), and also Mac's paramour. Highly intelligent, well-disciplined, and known to oppose thoughtless enforcement of regulations.
 Reg Dibson - Supporting character; an aging gorilla, janitor aboard the Fist. He is Mac's best friend and fellow nonconformist.
 Kara Soki - Assistant Librarian, and Robin's primary love interest until she leaves for Earth.
 Major [later Colonel] Benjamin Henniker - Systems analyst and quintessential bureaucrat; personifies conformity, and is therefore antagonist to Mac and Robin.
 Lyle Brand - Barbara's brother, and leader of a rival squadron.
 Jeff Simons - Chef in the Astro Bistro; Mac's assistant before Robin, and Robin's ally. Following the betting scandals, he returns to Earth, accompanied by Kara.
 Dr. Savin - ship's dentist; a caricature obsessed with "devious practices" of oral hygiene.
 Kim Barnett - Youngest member of Barbarian Squadron; introduced in Book 2. Robin's second paramour.

Story
The prologue states that an extraterrestrial armada (later known as 'Grakks') having destroyed sixty percent of the human population, a society of godlike 'Benefactors' rebuild Earthly civilization, in exchange for military help against the attackers. To replace the missing sixty percent, the Benefactors bestow humanlike intelligence and habits upon Earth's gorillas, and thus produce a combined civilization on Earth. Thereafter the first book depicts a series of anecdotes, dialogues, and misadventures featuring crew of Earth's interstellar military establishment: the immense space station Fist of Earth. Here, the conflict and comic relief of the story arises from the protagonists' dislike of middle management and blind enforcement of rules, and the insistence thereon by senior officer 'Benjamin Henniker'.

In the second book, the hostile fleet attack the Fist of Earth after 50 years' absence, and are opposed by the Fist'''s crew and scientists in a short series of dogfights. Following the first such sequence, the Benefactors identify the fleet as renegade creations of their own, under the command of a single rogue of the Benefactors' own species. In the second sequence of fights, this rogue's own battleship nearly cripples the Fist''; but Mac, wielding an immense directed-energy weapon equipped with the enemy's technology, destroys part of the battleship, and thus provokes a retreat.

Footnotes

External links
 

1996 comics debuts
Gorilla characters in comics
Image Comics titles
Kitchen Sink Press titles
Comics about animals